Days Between Stations is the first and self-titled album by the Los Angeles, California based progressive rock band Days Between Stations.

Critical reception
Days Between Stations received positive reviews from publications such as Progression Magazine, The Prog Files, and Gnosis.

Track listing
All music and lyrics were written by Sepand Samzadeh and Oscar Fuentes.

"Requiem for the Living" – 13:26
"Either/Or" – 7:33
"Intermission 1" – 2:13 
"How to Seduce a Ghost" – 4:55
"Radio Song" – 4:24
"Intermission 2" – 1:36
"Laudanum" – 22:14
Part I   "A long goodbye"
Part II  "Every One is here but You"
Part III "Nowhere"
Part IV  "The Wake"

Personnel
Sepand Samzadeh – synthesizer, guitar
Oscar Fuentes – synthesizer, acoustic guitar
Additional musicians
Jon Mattox – drums, percussion
Hollie – vocals
Jeffery Samzadeh – vocals
Vivi Rama – bass guitar
Jason Hemmens – saxophone
Sean Erick – trumpet
Kevin Williams – trombone
Jeremy Castillo – additional guitars
Marjory Fuentes – voice

References

2007 albums
Days Between Stations albums